Pacific coast may be used to reference any coastline that borders the Pacific Ocean.

Pacific Coast may also refer to;

Schools
 Pacific Coast High School in Tustin, California
 Pacific Coast School in Prince Rupert, British Columbia.
 Pacific Coast University in Long Beach, California.

Transportation
 Honda Pacific Coast, a motorcycle manufactured by Honda between 1989 and 1998
 Pacific Coast Way, a road from Sydney, New South Wales to Cairns in Queensland, Australia
 Pacific Coast Railroad (disambiguation)
 Pacific Coast Highway (disambiguation)

Others
 Pacific Coast Air Museum in Santa Rosa, California
 Pacific Coast Jet, a corporation based in San Francisco, California
 Pacific Coast League, a minor league United States Baseball league
 Pacific Coast League (California), a high school sports league in Orange County, California

See also

 
 
 Coastal Pacific, KiwiRail, New Zealand; a passenger rail service
 Pacific Seaboard Air Lines